The SNCF Class Z 9600 electric multiple units were built by Alsthom between 1984–1987. They are part of the Z2 type of electric multiple units, all similarly styled. The other Z2 classes are Z 7300, Z 7500 and Z 9500. This class operate in the Loire and the Alps. The class wear several liveries. The original livery, shown in the top picture, of Dark Blue with Red fronts. Also the Blue Regional livery and the new TER livery.

In this class there are 36 units.

Z 09600
Alstom multiple units
Electric multiple units of France